The 1950 San Diego State Aztecs football team represented San Diego State College during the 1950 college football season.

San Diego State competed in the California Collegiate Athletic Association (CCAA). The team was led by fourth-year head coach Bill Schutte, and played home games at Aztec Bowl. They finished the season with five wins, three losses and one tie (5–3–1, 3–0–1 CCAA). Overall, the team outscored its opponents 212–186 for the season.

Schedule

Team players in the NFL
No San Diego State players were selected in the 1951 NFL Draft.

Notes

References

San Diego State
San Diego State Aztecs football seasons
California Collegiate Athletic Association football champion seasons
San Diego State Aztecs football